The 1969 Italian Open was a combined men's and women's tennis tournament that was played on outdoor clay courts at the Foro Italico in Rome, Italy. It was the 26th edition of the tournament and the first that was open to amateur and professional players. The event was held from 21 April through 28 April 1969 and finished a day late. The singles titles were won by second-seeded John Newcombe and Julie Heldman, the first American female player to win the title in 13 years.

Finals

Men's singles
 John Newcombe defeated  Tony Roche 6–3, 4–6, 6–2, 5–7, 6–3

Women's singles
 Julie Heldman defeated  Kerry Melville 7–5, 6–3

Men's doubles
 Tom Okker /  Marty Riessen shared the title with  John Newcombe /  Tony Roche 4–6, 6–1, susp

Women's doubles
 Françoise Dürr /  Ann Haydon-Jones defeated  Rosemary Casals /  Billie Jean King 6–3, 3–6, 6–2

Notes

References

External links
International Tennis Federation (ITF) – Tournament details
Association of Tennis Professionals (ATP) – Tournament profile
Official tournament website

Italian Open (tennis)
Italian Open
Italian Open
Italian Open